Gerard Bennett may refer to:

Gerard Bennett, musician in 'O' Level
Gerard Bennett in Southwark London Borough Council election, 2014

See also
Gerald Bennett (born 1943), American politician
Jerry Bennett (disambiguation)